Band-e Qara Glacier is a Glacier, located in Band-e Qara, Razavi Khorasan Province.

References 

Glaciers of Iran
Kuhsorkh County